Club IDUNSA is a Peruvian football club, playing in the city of Arequipa, Peru.

Honours

Regional
Región VII: 1
Winners (1): 2007
Runner-up (1): 2008

Liga Departamental de Arequipa: 2
Winners (2): 2007, 2008

Liga Distrital de Arequipa: 1
Winners (1): 2007

See also
List of football clubs in Peru
Peruvian football league system

References

Football clubs in Peru
Association football clubs established in 2003